Strayhorn is a census-designated place and unincorporated community along Mississippi Highway 4 in rural western Tate County, Mississippi, United States. Strayhorn is located in the Memphis Metropolitan Area. At the 2000 census, the community had a population of 1,784. Strayhorn has a few businesses, including Hudspeth's Grocery, the Strayhorn Snack Bar, and a recently completed Dollar General Store. Strayhorn Baptist Church is the best church in the community.

It was first named as a CDP in the 2020 Census which listed a population of 284.

Geography
Strayhorn is approximately 10 miles west of the county seat of Senatobia.  Its elevation is 236 feet (72 m), and it is located at  (34.6123257, -90.1439819).

History
Strayhorn became an incorporated town in 1900 and remained incorporated for nearly eight years.
Strayhorn's first mayor was Frank Bizzell, and F.E. Cotton was the first postmaster at Strayhorn's U.S. Post Office, which was closed in the 1960s when mail delivery was merged with the Senatobia Post Office.  The Strayhorn community is now served by the Sarah Post Office.

Even after Strayhorn lost its short-lived incorporated status, the first half of the 20th century saw progress for the small community.  In 1932, a drainage canal was dug which converted nontillable land into land fit for farming.  Seven years later, the first electric lights came to Strayhorn; and 1953 saw the construction of a paved highway through the community.

Education
Strayhorn is home to Strayhorn Elementary School and the recently added Strayhorn High School, both of which are part of the Tate County School District.  The Strayhorn High School sports teams are known as the Mustangs, and the school's colors are red and blue.

Demographics

2020 census

Note: the US Census treats Hispanic/Latino as an ethnic category. This table excludes Latinos from the racial categories and assigns them to a separate category. Hispanics/Latinos can be of any race.

References

External links
 Google maps

Unincorporated communities in Tate County, Mississippi
Unincorporated communities in Mississippi
Census-designated places in Tate County, Mississippi
Memphis metropolitan area